St. Matthews is a town in Calhoun County, South Carolina, United States. The population was 2,021 at the 2010 census, a decline from 2,107 in 2000. It is the county seat of Calhoun County.

St. Matthews is part of the Columbia, South Carolina Metropolitan Statistical Area.

The town holds an annual Purple Martin festival in April which includes food, music, cars, and more.

History
St. Matthews was established as the township of Amelia by Gov. Robert Johnson in the 1730s. The Col. J.A. Banks House, Buyck's Bluff Archeological Site, Calhoun County Courthouse, Calhoun County Library, Cherokee Path, Sterling Land Grant, Col. Olin M. Dantzler House, David Houser House, Prehistoric Indian Village, and Puritan Farm are listed on the National Register of Historic Places.

Geography
St. Matthews is located in the center of Calhoun County at  (33.664734, -80.778976). U.S. Route 601 passes through the town, leading northeast  to Camden and southwest  to Orangeburg. South Carolina Highway 6 crosses US 601 in the center of town and leads west  to Interstate 26 and southeast  to Interstate 95 near Santee.

Education
Public education in St. Matthews is administered by Calhoun County School District. The district operates St. Matthews K-8 School, Sandy Run K-8 School, and Calhoun County High School.

Calhoun Academy, a school founded as a segregation academy, remains a private institution.

St. Matthews has a lending library, the Calhoun County Public Library.

St. Matthews is home to the Calhoun County Museum, on Butler Street, which is run and directed by Mrs. Roland. The Museum houses countless artifacts and stories of St. Matthews history and character.

Notable people

 Mike Colter, actor
 Viola Davis, Academy Award-winning actress
 Clarence Felder, actor
 Alshon Jeffery, Philadelphia Eagles (NFL) and (former) University of South Carolina wide receiver; Super Bowl LII champion
 Ludwig Lewisohn, writer, critic and poet
 Phillip Merling, Miami Dolphins defensive end in the NFL
 Horace Ott, musician, orchestral conductor and songwriter
 Eartha Kitt, singer, actress, dancer and activist
 James "Blood" Ulmer, jazz and blues guitarist
 Othniel Wienges, politician and horse breeder
 Russell Ott, South Carolina House Representative and lobbyist

Demographics

2020 census

As of the 2020 United States census, there were 1,841 people, 943 households, and 531 families residing in the town.

2000 census
As of the census of 2000, there were 2,107 people, 823 households, and 549 families residing in the town. The population density was 1,091.1 people per square mile (421.5/km2). There were 913 housing units at an average density of 472.8 per square mile (182.6/km2). The racial makeup of the town was 37.16% White, 61.46% African American, 0.05% Native American, 0.09% Asian, 0.14% Pacific Islander, 0.38% from other races, and 0.71% from two or more races. Hispanic or Latino of any race were 1.33% of the population.

There were 823 households, out of which 27.2% had children under the age of 18 living with them, 41.8% were married couples living together, 21.4% had a female householder with no husband present, and 33.2% were non-families. 30.6% of all households were made up of individuals, and 14.9% had someone living alone who was 65 years of age or older. The average household size was 2.39 and the average family size was 3.00.

In the town, the population was spread out, with 23.5% under the age of 18, 6.2% from 18 to 24, 23.3% from 25 to 44, 24.0% from 45 to 64, and 23.0% who were 65 years of age or older. The median age was 43 years. For every 100 females, there were 72.8 males. For every 100 females age 18 and over, there were 66.3 males.

The median income for a household in the town was $24,969, and the median income for a family was $36,250. Males had a median income of $29,760 versus $21,311 for females. The per capita income for the town was $14,911. About 19.5% of families and 24.0% of the population were below the poverty line, including 32.8% of those under age 18 and 21.4% of those age 65 or over.

References

External links

 Calhoun County Museum and Cultural Center
 Information about St. Matthews from the Calhoun County Chamber of Commerce

Towns in Calhoun County, South Carolina
Towns in South Carolina
County seats in South Carolina
Columbia metropolitan area (South Carolina)